Cricetulus is a genus of rodent in the family Cricetidae (voles and hamsters); it has seven member species that inhabit arid or semi-arid regions in Eurasia.

They tend to be more ratlike in appearance than typical hamsters, hence the common name ratlike hamster. Many of the species are considered dwarf hamsters. However, members of the genera Allocricetulus, Tscherskia, and Cansumys are often called ratlike hamsters, and so are considered to be members of the genus Cricetulus by many authorities.

Species
Cricetulus alticola — Tibetan dwarf hamster
Cricetulus barabensis — Chinese striped hamster
Cricetulus griseus — Chinese hamster
Cricetulus kamensis — Kam dwarf hamster
Cricetulus lama — Lama dwarf hamster
Cricetulus longicaudatus — long-tailed dwarf hamster
Cricetulus migratorius — grey dwarf hamster
Cricetulus sokolovi — Sokolov's dwarf hamster

See also 

 Phodopus, other dwarf hamsters

References

Duff, A. and A. Lawson. 2004. Mammals of the World A Checklist. New Haven, Yale University Press.
Nowak, Ronald M. 1999. Walker's Mammals of the World, 6th edition. Johns Hopkins University Press, 1936 pp. 

 
Rodent genera
Taxa named by Henri Milne-Edwards